Lela is a small town in western Kenya near Lake Victoria.  Elevation 1454m.

Transport 

It is located 20 km northwest of Kisumu and 5 km south of Maseno, off the B1 road between Kisumu and Busia.

It is served by a little used lightly built branchline of the Kenya railway system, which is slated for upgrade.

See also 

 Railway stations in Kenya

References 

Populated places in Nyanza Province
Kisumu County